Eastern Macedonia and Thrace is one of the thirteen administrative regions of Greece. It consists of the northeastern parts of the country, comprising the eastern part of the region of Macedonia along with the region of Western Thrace, and the islands of Thasos and Samothrace.

Administration

Administrative history

The region of Eastern Macedonia and Thrace was established in the 1987 administrative reform as the Eastern Macedonia and Thrace Region (. With the 2010 Kallikratis plan, its powers and authority were redefined and extended, with the preexisting region in many respects inheriting status and weight of the five now abolished prefectures, Drama, Evros, Kavala, Rhodope and Xanthi.

In this special case, the region of Eastern Macedonia and Thrace also succeeds the intermediate structure of the two super-prefectures of Drama-Kavala-Xanthi and of Rhodope-Evros into which the five prefectures had been grouped since 1994.

Current status
The capital of the region is Komotini, which by population is the fourth largest city, following Alexandroupolis, Kavala and Xanthi. The region is divided into the Macedonian regional units of Drama, Kavala and Thasos and the Thracian regional units of Xanthi, Rhodope and Evros, which coincide with the territory of the former prefectures, except for Thasos, which was part of the Kavala prefecture. Unlike the former prefectures, the regional units however have very limited administrative powers.

Along with Central Macedonia, the region is supervised by the Decentralized Administration of Macedonia and Thrace based at Thessaloniki.

Regional governor
The political post of the Regional governor was also created in the course of the Kallikratis reform and can be considered the successor of the former prefects. The current governor is Christos Metios, who succeeded in November 2016 deceased Giorgos Pavlidis (Nea Dimokratia). Pavlidis was elected in the 2014 regional election, beating the incumbent first-ever regional governor and former Prefect of Rhodopi,  (PASOK), elected in the 2010 regional election.

Demographics
The region is home to Greece's main Muslim minority, made up mainly of Pomaks and Western Thrace Turks, whose presence dates to the Ottoman period. Unlike the Muslims of Macedonia, Epirus, and elsewhere in northern Greece, they were exempted from the Greek-Turkish population exchange following the 1923 Treaty of Lausanne. According to the 1991 census, the Muslim minority numbered around 98,000 people or 29% of the population of Western Thrace, of which about half were Western Thrace Turks and the rest (35%) Pomaks and Muslim Romani people (15%).  In the 2014 European elections in Greece, 42,533 people from Eastern Macedonia and Thrace voted for the Party of Friendship, Equality and Peace, which represents what it regards as the Muslim minority in Greece. These Muslim minority populations are completely distinct from the Ottoman-era Greek Muslims, such as the Vallahades of Western Macedonia, who were almost entirely expatriated to Turkey as part of the population exchange.

The region has shrunk by 46,113 people between 2011 and 2021, experiencing a population loss of 7.6%.

Economy
The Gross domestic product (GDP) of the region was 7.2 billion € in 2018, accounting for 3.9% of Greek economic output. GDP per capita adjusted for purchasing power was 14,300 € or 48% of the EU27 average in the same year. The GDP per employee was 61% of the EU average. Eastern Macedonia and Thrace is the region in Greece with the second lowest GDP per capita and one of the poorest regions in the EU.

Culture

Major municipalities

Alexandroúpoli (Αλεξανδρούπολη) - 72,959 people
Xánthi (Ξάνθη) - 70,873 people
Kavála (Καβάλα) - 70,501 people
Komotiní (Κομοτηνή) - 66,919 people
Dráma (Δράμα) - 58,944 people

Major cities and towns
Alexandroupolis
Chrysoupoli
Didymoteicho
Drama
Eleftheroupoli
Feres
Kavala
Kimmeria
Komotini
Nea Orestiada
Prosotsani
Soufli
Xanthi

References

External links

  

 
Macedonia (Greece)
NUTS 2 statistical regions of the European Union
States and territories established in 1987
Administrative regions of Greece